Ladybridge High School is a mixed secondary school located in the Deane area of Bolton, Greater Manchester, England.

History
The Deane School was built in 1969 as a grammar school and a secondary modern school on the same site, a fact reflected in the mirrored architecture of the school buildings. It later became a comprehensive school with pupils split into two "populations" and forms named after the letters of the school name. Today it is a community school administered by Bolton Metropolitan Borough Council.

The Deane School also had the rare distinction of a school farm, which is still part of Ladybridge High School. This was established on 4 January 1970, by Fred Tyldesley, to help children from its mostly urban catchment area to experience working with animals. As well as conventional livestock the farm became a centre for rare and endangered species, including pygmy goats and pot-bellied pigs.

During the late 1980s Deane School had as headmaster a capped England footballer, Warren Bradley.
 	
After a period of decline at the turn of the century, the Deane School was put into special measures by Ofsted due to a series of poor inspection results. In 2004 the school was reopened as part of the 'Fresh Start' programme and was renamed Ladybridge High School. As part of this Ladybridge High became part of the Brook Learning Partnershipa collaborative partnership with Rivington and Blackrod High School.

Academics
Ladybridge High School offers GCSEs, Cambridge Nationals and the DiDA courses. The school has a specialism in sports and offers its sports facilities for use by the local community.

References

External links
Ladybridge High School official website

Secondary schools in the Metropolitan Borough of Bolton
Educational institutions established in 1969
1969 establishments in England
Community schools in the Metropolitan Borough of Bolton